Priesterbäker See is a lake in Müritz National Park, Mecklenburg-Vorpommern, Germany. At an elevation of 62.6 m, its surface area is 1.53 km².

Lakes of Mecklenburg-Western Pomerania